The 4th Cavalry Brigade was a cavalry brigade of the British Army.  It served in the Napoleonic Wars (notably at the Battle of Waterloo), in the First World War on the Western Front where it was initially assigned to The Cavalry Division before spending most of the war with the 2nd Cavalry Division, and with the 1st Cavalry Division during the Second World War.

History

Napoleonic Wars
From June 1809, Wellington organized his cavalry into one, later two, cavalry divisions (1st and 2nd) for the Peninsular War. These performed a purely administrative, rather than tactical, role; the normal tactical headquarters were provided by brigades commanding two, later usually three, regiments. The cavalry brigades were named for the commanding officer, rather than numbered.  For the Hundred Days Campaign, he numbered his British cavalry brigades in a single sequence, 1st to 7th.  The 4th Cavalry Brigade consisted of:
11th Light Dragoons 
12th (Prince of Wales's) Light Dragoons
16th (Queen's) Light Dragoons
It was commanded by Major General Sir John Ormsby Vandeleur.

The brigade took part in the Battle of Waterloo.  During the battle, the 11th Light Dragoons suffered 63 casualties (12 killed, 28 wounded, 23 missing), the 12th Light Dragoons 111 (47 killed, 64 wounded) and the 16th Light Dragoons just 30 (10 killed, 20 wounded). This represented a loss rate of about 15%.

Second Boer War
Following the outbreak of the Second Boer War in late 1899, a 4th Cavalry Brigade was established under the command of Major-General John Dickson. The brigade was composed of squadrons from the 7th Dragoon Guards, 8th Hussars and 17th Lancers, with drafts from the 19th Hussars and 1st Dragoons, and was mobilized for service on 1 January 1900, leaving for South Africa the following month. The Mounted Infantry for the brigade was 300 men strong, and was drawn from the 2nd Battalion Leicestershire Regiment, the 1st Battalion Royal Berkshire Regiment, the 1st Battalion Yorkshire Light Infantry, the 2nd Battalion Manchester Regiment, the 4th Battalion of the King's Royal Rifle Corps, and the 4th Battalion of the Rifle Brigade, with a machine-gun section from the 2nd Battalion Liverpool Regiment. The No. 20 Field Hospital Royal Army Medical Corps was attached to the brigade.

First World War

Mobilization
4th Cavalry Brigade was a peacetime formation of the British Army, based in Eastern Command.  At the outbreak of the war, it was headquartered at Canterbury and commanded the 6th Dragoon Guards (Carabiniers) (at Canterbury), 3rd (King's Own) Hussars (at Shorncliffe) and 4th Signal Troop, Royal Engineers (at Canterbury).  A number of units were attached to the brigade: the 19th (Queen Alexandra's Own Royal) Hussars at Hounslow, the Woolwich-based X Brigade, RHA (P and R Batteries), II Brigade, RHA (consisting of just C Battery and based at Canterbury) and King Edward's Horse of the Special Reserve (based at Chelsea).

On mobilization, the brigade was brought up to its full – three regiment – strength with the addition of the Household Cavalry Composite Regiment; 4th Cavalry Brigade Field Ambulance also joined and the attached units departed at this point.  The brigade joined The Cavalry Division along with 1st, 2nd and 3rd Cavalry Brigades and moved to France in August 1914.

Early actions
With The Cavalry Division, the brigade took part in a number of actions during the early war of movement: the Battle of Mons (23–24 August), the Battle of Le Cateau (26 August), the action at Néry (1 September), the Battle of the Marne (6–9 September) and the Battle of the Aisne (12–15 September).

The brigade was transferred to the 2nd Cavalry Division on 14 October 1914 to bring it up to the standard three brigade strength.  It remained with the division on the Western Front until the end of the war.

2nd Cavalry Division
In 1914, the brigade, with the division, took part in First Battle of Ypres, notably the battle of Gheluvelt (29–31 October). On 11 November, the Household Cavalry Composite Regiment was broken up and its constituent squadrons rejoined their parent regiments. The 1/1st Queen's Own Oxfordshire Hussars, a Yeomanry regiment, joined in its place.

In 1915, the division was in action at the Battle of Neuve Chapelle (10–12 March 1915) and the Second Battle of Ypres notably the Battle of St Julien (26 April–3 May) and the Battle of Bellewaarde Ridge (24–25 May).

On 28 February 1916, a Machine Gun Squadron was formed from the machine gun sections of the brigade's constituent regiments.

1916 saw no notable actions, but in 1917 the division saw action in the Battle of Arras (First Battle of the Scarpe, 9–11 April). and the Battle of Cambrai (the Tank Attack of 20–21 November, the Capture of Bourlon Wood of 24–28 November and the German Counter-Attack of 30 November–3 December). At other times, the brigade formed a dismounted unit and served in the trenches as a regiment under the command of the brigadier.

War of movement
1918 saw the return of the war of movement and the division took part in the First Battle of the Somme notably the Battle of St Quentin (21–23 March), the Battle of the Lys (Battle of Hazebrouck of 14–15 April), the Battle of Amiens (8–11 August) and the Second Battle of the Somme (Battle of Albert of 21–23 August and the Second Battle of Bapaume of 31 August–3 September).

The division was then split up with the 4th Cavalry Brigade serving with Third Army.  The brigade took part in the battles of the Hindenburg Line, notably the Battle of the Canal du Nord (27 September–1 October) and the Pursuit to the Selle (9–12 October).  Its final action was to take part in the Advance in Picardy (17 October–11 November) including the Battle of the Sambre (4 November), still with Third Army.

Armistice
At the Armistice, the brigade had reached Erquelinnes with Third Army.  On 15 November, the division was re-assembled near Maubeuge and ordered to advance into Germany as an advance screen for Fourth Army and form part of the Occupation Force. The move began on 17 November, Ciney and Rochefort were reached five days later.

In late December, the division moved to winter quarters south and south-east of Liège.  It remained here until 30 January 1919 when it exchanged regiments with 1st and 3rd Cavalry Divisions then gradually moved back to England.  The Division ceased to exist at midnight 31 March / 1 April 1919.

Order of battle

Second World War
The 4th Cavalry Brigade was reformed in October 1939 and took command of a composite regiment of Household Cavalry and two Yeomanry regiments (North Somerset Yeomanry and Royal Wiltshire Yeomanry). It joined the 1st Cavalry Division when it was formed on 31 October 1939.

With the 1st Cavalry Division, the 4th Cavalry Brigade departed the United Kingdom in February 1940, transited across France, and arrived in Palestine on 20 February 1940.  It served as a garrison force under British Forces, Palestine and Trans-Jordan.

From 6 May 1941 the brigade, together with a battalion of infantry from the Essex Regiment, a mechanised regiment from the Arab Legion and supporting artillery was organised as Habforce for operations in Iraq including the relief of the base at RAF Habbaniya and the occupation of Baghdad.  Following this, in July 1941 it was placed under the command of I Australian Corps and was involved in operations against the Vichy French in Syria, advancing from eastern Iraq near the Trans-Jordan border on Palmyra to secure the Haditha – Tripoli oil pipeline.

On 1 August 1941, the Division was converted into the 10th Armoured Division and the 4th Cavalry Brigade into the 9th Armoured Brigade. 9th Armoured Brigade would later take part in the Second Battle of El Alamein and the Italian Campaign.

Order of battle
Unlike in the First World War, when brigade compositions rarely changed, there was considerable movement of units between the 4th, 5th and 6th Cavalry Brigades in the Second World War.

Of the three regiments with the brigade when it was converted to an armoured formation:
the 1st Household Cavalry Regiment converted into an Armoured Regiment in 9th Armoured Brigade before becoming the Reconnaissance Regiment for 10th Armoured Division. 
the Royal Wiltshire Yeomanry converted into an Armoured Regiment in 9th Armoured Brigade. It fought in the Second Battle of El Alamein and the Italian Campaign. 
the Warwickshire Yeomanry converted into an Armoured Regiment in 9th Armoured Brigade. It also fought at El Alamein and throughout the Italian Campaign.

Commanders
The 4th Cavalry Brigade had the following commanders during the First World War:

The 4th Cavalry Brigade had the following commanders during the Second World War:

See also

 Order of battle of the Waterloo Campaign
 British Army during World War I
 British Cavalry Corps order of battle 1914
 British cavalry during the First World War
 List of British brigades of the Second World War

Notes

References

Bibliography

External links
 
 
 
 
 
 

4
Military units and formations established in 1815
Military units and formations disestablished in 1815
Military units and formations established in 1914
Military units and formations disestablished in 1919
Military units and formations established in 1939
Military units and formations disestablished in 1941
1815 establishments in the United Kingdom
Military units and formations in Canterbury
Military units and formations in Kent